The Congregational Christian Church of Tuvalu (Tuvaluan: Te Ekalesia Kelisiano Tuvalu, EKT), commonly the Church of Tuvalu, is a Christian Church which is the state church of Tuvalu, although this status merely entitles it to "the privilege of performing special services on major national events". Its adherents comprise about 97% of the ~11,000 inhabitants of the archipelago, and theologically, it is part of the Calvinist tradition.

The Constitution of Tuvalu guarantees freedom of religion, including the freedom to practice, the freedom to change religion, the right not to receive religious instruction at school or to attend religious ceremonies at school, and the right not to "take an oath or make an affirmation that is contrary to [one's] religion or beliefs".

History
Christianity first came to Tuvalu in 1861 when Elekana, a deacon of a Congregational church in Manihiki, Cook Islands became caught in a storm and drifted for eight weeks before landing at Nukulaelae. Elekana began proselytising Christianity. He was trained at Malua Theological College, a London Missionary Society school in Samoa, before beginning his work in establishing the Church of Tuvalu. In 1865, the Reverend A. W. Murray of the London Missionary Society (LMS) – a Protestant congregationalist missionary society – arrived as the first European missionary where he too proselytized among the inhabitants of Tuvalu. Murray was followed by the Reverend Samuel James Whitmee in 1870.

The first pastors were: Ioane at Nukulaelae (1865-88); Kirisome at Nui (1865-99); Tema at Funafuti (1870-89); and Jeremia at Vaitupu (1880-95). In 1896 the pastor on Funafuti was Simona. At the end of the 19th century, the ministers of what became the Church of Tuvalu were predominantly Samoans, who influenced the development of the Tuvaluan language and the music of Tuvalu. 

The LMS Church in the Ellice Islands remained part of the Samoan LMS Church’s congregational system until 1958, and was administered (together with Tokelau and the Gilbert Islands, under the title, the Northwest Outstations of the Samoan Mission. In 1958, the LMS Church in the Ellice Islands became self-governing. Ellice Islander ministers were trained at Mälua, the LMS College in Western Samoa. The Samoan language Bible was used until 1978 when a Tuvaluan-language New Testament was published.

In 1969, the ETK acquired its independence from the LMS, since which time it has sent some missionaries to serve Tuvaluan migrants in Fiji, New Zealand, Hawaii, Australia, and the Marshall Islands.

The former Governor-General of Tuvalu, Rev Sir Filoimea Telito, presided over the Church until his death in July 2011. The Church currently publishes a bulletin in the Tuvaluan and English languages.

The Reverend Kalahati Kilei, President of the ETK and Pastor for the island community of Funafuti, died on 10 September 2019 at Princess Margaret Hospital.

The most prominent building on Funafuti is the Fētu'ao Lima (Morning Star Church) of the Church of Tuvalu.

The Tuvalu Community Church congregation of Henderson, Auckland, New Zealand, was established in 1992. In 2021 the congregation opened a new church, which was designed by South Pacific Architecture, which won a Public Architecture Award at the 2021 Auckland Architecture Awards.

Beliefs
The Church is Calvinist in doctrine and congregational in organisation. There is an ordination for women which occurred on July 16th 2022 with the first two women, Rev Oliula Kalahati and Rev. Sulufaiga Uota (EKT Head Office, 2022). The Apostles' Creed and the Nicene Creed are generally accepted. Being the de facto state church, the Church of Tuvalu dominates most aspects of social, cultural and political life in the country.

Fetuvalu Secondary School
The Church operates Fetuvalu Secondary School, a day school which is located on Funafuti.

Relations
The Church is a member of the World Association for Christian Communication, the Boys' Brigade International Fellowship, the World Communion of Reformed Churches, Council for World Mission, the World Council of Churches, and the Pacific Conference of Churches. It also has ties with the Methodist Church in Fiji, the Congregational Christian Church in Samoa, the Kiribati Uniting Church, the Uniting Church in Australia, and the Methodist and Presbyterian churches in New Zealand.

References

Churches in Tuvalu
Tuvalu
Tuvalu
Congregationalism
Tuvalu
Reformed denominations in Oceania
1861 establishments in Oceania